Sìleas na Ceapaich (also known as Cicely Macdonald of Keppoch, Silis of Keppoch, Sìleas MacDonnell or Sìleas Nic Dhòmhnail na Ceapaich) was a Scottish poet. She lived between c.1660 and 1729.

The Gaelic name Sìleas is anglicised variously as Cicely or Julia.

Life

Sìleas came from a landowning family within the clan system still prevalent in the Highlands at the time. She was the daughter of the 15th Chief of Clan MacDonald of Keppoch, Archibald (Gilleasbuig) Macdonald, and Mary Macmartin of the Macmartin Camerons. Her brother Coll was 16th Chief. Although the family of Keppoch had lost some status, they were still considered to be in the upper levels of Gaelic society.

She was married to Alexander Gordon of Camdell, estate factor to the Duke of Gordon, and lived much of her adult life at Beldorney Castle, Banffshire, although she grew up in Lochaber. She is known to have had at least eight children, five sons and three daughters.

Work

She is most notable for the 23 poems she wrote in the Scottish Gaelic language. Many of her poems are political, having a strongly Jacobite theme. Others include laments for friends killed in the uprisings of the period, humorous advice to ummarried women, and a handful of devotional poems. Among the Jacobite poems attributed to her is Tha mi am chadal, "I am sleeping", closely related to the Irish air Táimse im' chodladh. Her best known poem is her c. 1723 lament for Alasdair Dubh, 11th Chief of Glengarry, which hearkens back to the mythological poetry attributed to Amergin Glúingel. Like her other work, the lament seems to have been aimed at an audience mainly within the various branches of Clan Donald.

Her surviving poems are in a mixture of classical Gaelic syllabic metres and newer stressed metres, and were clearly intended to be sung, with some being based on popular songs of the time.

References

External links
'Hymn to the Virgin Mary' (words by Sìleas na Ceapaich, as performed by Maggie MacInnes on her album 'Leaving Mingulay')

18th-century Scottish Gaelic poets
Scottish Gaelic women poets
Scottish Gaelic poets
Clan MacDonald of Keppoch
17th-century Scottish Gaelic poets
18th-century Scottish people
18th-century Scottish women writers

Scottish_Catholic_poets